Robert William Wuesthoff (May 25, 1926 – July 12, 2013) was the baseball coach for the Long Beach State Forty Niners Baseball Team from 1964 to 1969 and the founder of "49er Camp," a youth sports summer camp created at Cal State Long Beach in 1968 that is still running strong today.

Career 
In 1964, Long Beach State hired the former junior varsity baseball coach to succeed Dick Clegg, who had been instrumental in bringing Wuesthoff to Long Beach State as his assistant. Under the guidance of Wuesthoff, the 1964 Forty Niners Baseball Team, then Division II, beat the defending national champion USC Trojans as well as the nation's #2 ranked Arizona Wildcats on their road to winning the CCAA League Title. By sweeping the defending CCAA Champion Fresno State Bulldogs, ending the league with a record of 11 wins and 4 losses, and giving the Forty Niners a birth into the NCAA National Tournament, Wuesthoff was named CCAA Coach of the Year, and NCAA Western Regional Coach of the Year.

Head coaching record

References

1926 births
2013 deaths
San Jose State Spartans men's basketball coaches
San Jose State Spartans men's basketball players
San Jose State Spartans baseball players
Long Beach State Dirtbags baseball coaches
Sportspeople from Alameda, California
Sportspeople from Long Beach, California
Baseball players from Long Beach, California